Wacław is a Polish masculine given name.

For etymology and cognates in other languages, see Wenceslaus.

It may refer to:

Wacław Leszczyński
Wacław of Szamotuły
Wacław Hański
Wacław Michał Zaleski
Wacław Sierpiński
Wacław Kiełtyka
Wacław Gajewski
Wacław Szybalski
Wacław Maciejowski
Wacław Kopisto
Wacław Zawadowski
Wacław Micuta
Wacław Kuchar
Wacław Szymanowski
Wacław Seweryn Rzewuski
Wacław Cimochowski
Wacław Sieroszewski
Wacław Zagórski

Other forms of Wenceslaus exist natively in Polish, but only as a surname, including Wącław, Węcław, and Więcław, as well as their respective phonetic spellings Woncław, Wencław, and Wiencław.

Polish masculine given names